Ross Kemp: Extreme World is a British documentary series that has been broadcast on Sky 1 since 21 February, 2011. Hosted by actor Ross Kemp, the series follows Kemp and a film crew around the world as they explore various forms of hardship, including homelessness, illicit trade, drug addiction, violence and poverty. Often, he speaks to the authorities who are attempting to combat the problems, and tries to establish contact with ringleaders to get to the source of the issue. A total of six series have been aired since the launch of the show.

Production and development 
On 8 December 2015 it was confirmed via Kemp's official Twitter account that Extreme World would return for a fifth series, with filming beginning in the summer of 2015. Filming continued through to December, before taking a three-week break over the Christmas period. Filming restarted in January 2016. Filming once again broke in April 2016, due to Kemp filming scenes for his brief return to EastEnders. Filming on the series finished in May 2016. A sixth series has since been confirmed for broadcast in 2017, beginning with a special feature-length episode, "Libya's Migrant Hell", on 21 February 2017. However, the sixth series of Extreme World will be the last, with Sky1 having axed the series on 9 February 2017 to "make way for drama and comedy", as part of the channel's shift away from "commissioning factual entertainment".

Transmissions

Episodes

Series 1 (2011)

Ross Kemp returns to present another documentary series for Sky 1 named Ross Kemp: Extreme World. The series sees Kemp travel to places like Haiti and the Congo to learn more about the consequences of the 2011 Haiti earthquake and the ongoing conflict over Congo's mineral resources..

Series 2 (2012)

In the second series, Kemp returns to travel to places like Pakistan and East Africa to learn more about the battle for Karachi and the widespread belief in witchcraft respectively.

Series 3 (2014)

Ross Kemp: Extreme World Series 3 sees Kemp gaining access to the places and people caught up in contemporary global issues. The most recent run saw Kemp examine the conflicts in Northern Ireland, poverty and corruption in Las Vegas the crack epidemic in Rio de Janeiro as well as India's huge sex-trafficking industry.

Series 4 (2015)

Series four takes Kemp to explore more of the world's issues. The series sees him meeting criminal biker gangs in Australia, following Iraqi and Syrian immigrants in Calais, and exploring South Africa’s rape epidemic.

Series 5 (2016)

In the fifth series, Kemp heads to Colombia, Kurdistan, Mozambique, Mongolia and the US/Mexico border to investigate the cocaine trade, immigration and the conflict between Kurdish militia groups and terrorist group Islamic State.

Series 6 (2017)

The sixth and final series of Extreme Worlds started airing on 21 February 2017 on Sky One, it was the final series. Kemp travels to Libya, Texas, and the Philippines to cover the migrant crisis, right-wing extremists and the hard-line stance against drug traffickers and uses taken by former President of the Philippines, Rodrigo Duterte.

Home media
The first two seasons of Ross Kemp Extreme Worlds have been released on to DVD, Only the second series was released onto DVD in both regions.

References

External links

 
2011 British television series debuts
2017 British television series endings
2010s British documentary television series
British crime television series
English-language television shows
Sky UK original programming
Television series by Endemol
Television series by Tiger Aspect Productions